Leptacinus batychrus is a species of beetle belonging to the family Staphylinidae.

It has cosmopolitan distribution.

References

Staphylinidae